Wyoming has one of the highest wind power potentials of any state in the United States. In 2019, Wyoming had wind powered electricity generating capacity of 1,589 MW, which produced 9.85% of its electric generation, with an additional 3,753 MW under construction. However, the wind generation in that year was Wyoming's third-lowest in the 2010s. By 2020, wind capacity increased to 2738 MW and 8448 gigawatt-hours of electricity were produced from wind in 2021, more than double 2019 production. Additional wind capacity and needed transmission lines are under construction or planned, despite political headwinds from Wyoming's strong coal and oil sectors.

Resource
Wyoming's geography of high-altitude prairies with broad ridges makes the state an ideal site for the development of wind resources.  Other factors that positively affect Wyoming's wind power development potential include transmission capabilities, the high energy needs of nearby population centers, high public support of wind power development in the state (97% support), and the historical importance of energy sectors to the state's economy.

Disadvantages to large-scale wind power production include competition from fossil fuels industry, as coal power provided 42.7 TWh (90%) of Wyoming electricity in 2016, compared to 3.8 TWh for wind. Wyoming taxes wind power with $1/MWh which provided the state with $3.8 million in 2015.

The Big Hollow is a wind eroded deflation basin located to the west of Laramie, Wyoming in the United States. It is the second largest wind eroded depression in the world. The Big Hollow is the largest deflation basin in North America.

History

The first two wind turbines in Wyoming were constructed in Medicine Bow on September 4, 1982, by the National Aeronautics and Space Administration and the United States Department of Energy.  The wind turbines were the largest in the U.S. The two turbines included the WTS-4 at 391 feet tall, and the MOD-2 at 350 feet tall. Mayor of Medicine Bow Gerald Cook held an event with 500 residents at the construction site and declared September 4 "Wind Turbine Day."

Wyoming's first commercial wind farm was the Foote Creek Rim wind project located near Arlington completed on April 4, 1999. This 85 MW (megawatts) wind project had 69 wind turbines, and it is located in one of the windiest locations in the state. Due to average winds of 25 mph in the area, the wind project has a capacity factor of 43% of peak output annually, which is higher than most wind farms. As of 2016, the Foote Creek wind project has 183 turbines with a generating capacity of 134.7 MW.

In 2003, the Wyoming Wind Energy Center began operations. It has 80 turbines with a 144 MW capacity and is located near Evanston in Uinta County.

In 2008, the Glenrock Wind Project outside of Glenrock began operations on top of a reclaimed surface coal mine. PacifiCorp, the owner, "believe[s] this is the first wind facility in the West to recycle land that once provided fossil fuels into one that captures renewable energy." The wind project has 66 turbines that generate up to 99 MW, later up to 158 MW.

Seven Mile Hill and Seven Mile Hill II began operations between Hanna and Medicine Bow. It has 79 turbines with a generating capacity of 118.5 MW. In 2008, Mountain Wind Power, LLC and Mountain Wind Power II, LLC began operations. They have 67 turbines with a 140 MW capacity.

As of 2016, Wyoming had 1,489 megawatts (MW) of wind powered electricity generating capacity, responsible for 9.42% of in-state electricity production. Wyoming produced of 3,800 GWh in 2015, about 9% of the total.

In November 2008, the New York Times reported a land rush in Wyoming in anticipation of future wind power development projects.  Citizens and land-owners in Wyoming have formed numerous "wind associations" in the hopes of collectively bargaining for higher compensation for the use of their land in wind power production and transmission projects.  Most of these associations are located in the wind-power dense counties of southeastern Wyoming, including Platte, Converse, Goshen and Laramie counties.

In 2010, the High Plains and McFadden Ridge Wind Energy Project near Rock River began operations with 66 turbines. It has a capacity of 99 MW. Three Buttes Windpower, LLC, began operations in Converse County near Glenrock and has 66 turbines with a 99 MW capacity. Casper Wind Farm began operations near Casper in Natrona County and has 11 turbines with a generating capacity of 16.5 MW.

Energy Transportation Inc., headquartered in Casper, is a well-known logistics firm that transports overweight and outsized components used in the wind power industry. The Casper landfill is also a disposal site for windmill blades.

In 2010, Dunalap I began operations near Medicine Bow. It has 74 turbines with 111 MW capacity. The Top of the World Windpower Project began operations in Converse County near Glenrock and has 110 Turbines with a 200 MW capacity.

On November 16, 2016, Microsoft Corp bought 237 MW of wind power from Duke Energy's Happy Jack and Silver Sage wind farms in Wyoming along with Allianz Risk Transfer AG's Bloom Wind Project in Kansas to power a data center located in Cheyenne. This was the largest wind purchase in the history of Microsoft. Between 2011 and 2017, no wind farms were built in Wyoming.

The Chokecherry and Sierra Madre Wind Energy Project is the largest commercial wind generation facility under development in North America. Power Company of Wyoming has applied to the BLM to build approximately 1,000 wind turbines in an area located south of Rawlins, Wyoming, in Carbon County. The project is proposed to generate 2,000 to 3,000 megawatts (MW) of electricity and construction may take 3–4 years with a project life estimate of 30 years.

Wind energy generation

Source:

Wind energy consumption
In 2014, wind energy consumption in Wyoming was estimated to be 4,406 GWh.

See also

Solar power in Wyoming
Wind power in the United States
Renewable energy in the United States

References

External links

Map of wind associations in southern Wyoming

 
Economy of Wyoming